The McNary Levee System, also known as the Tri-Cities Levees, is an appurtenant or dam-related structure to McNary Lock and Dam, and consists of three groups of levee segments along the banks of the Columbia River that provide flood risk reduction for portions of Kennewick, Pasco, and Richland, Washington. The levee group names are based on location and are identified as the Kennewick Levees, Pasco Levees, and Richland Levees. Lake Wallula behind McNary Lock and Dam is about 63 miles long and includes 242 miles of shoreline and a drainage area of 214,000 square miles. The McNary Levee System consists of about 16.8 miles of earthen levees and 11 operational pump plants that remove agricultural runoff, groundwater migration, and rainfall runoff. Construction of the McNary Levee System began in 1950 and was completed in 1954.

References

Buildings and structures in Benton County, Washington
1954 establishments in Washington (state)
United States Army Corps of Engineers
Buildings and structures in Franklin County, Washington
Richland, Washington
Kennewick, Washington
Pasco, Washington